Possible Worlds may refer to:
 Possible worlds, concept in philosophy
 Possible Worlds (play), 1990 play by John Mighton
 Possible Worlds (film), 2000 film by Robert Lepage, based on the play
 Possible Worlds (studio)
 Possible Worlds, poetry book by Peter Porter
 Possible Worlds, book by J. B. S. Haldane
 Possible Worlds, 1995 album by Markus Stockhausen

See also
 
 
 Possible (disambiguation)
 World (disambiguation)